Fred Schneider and the Shake Society is the debut solo studio album by American new wave musician Fred Schneider, released in 1984 by Warner Bros. Records. It was re-released in 1991 as Fred Schneider.

Musicians and backing vocalists varied from track to track. Notable names included co-producer Bernie Worrell on keyboards, synthesizers and/or backing vocals on several tracks, as well as Schneider's B-52's bandmate Kate Pierson on backing vocals on four tracks, including "Monster" (in addition to appearing in its music video).

The song "Monster" peaked at No. 85 on the Billboard Hot 100 in July 1991, and its music video was included that year on the VHS video compilation The B-52's: 1979—1989. Although, Schneider himself was not a Trump supporter, the song became a staple of Donald Trump's rallies beginning in 2016.

In November 2020, Schneider released a new music video for the song "This Planet's a Mess."

Track listing
Lyrics written by Fred Schneider with music by John Coté, except as noted.

Track times on original release and 1991 re-release—which sometimes differ greatly—are both listed.

Side one
 "Monster" — 3:30 / 3:56 *
 "Cut the Concrete" — 4:02 / 4:01 *
 "Summer in Hell" — 4:19 / 4:21 *
 "Orbit" (Schneider, Ronald Ardito, Richard Beau) — 4:24 / 4:29
 "I'm Gonna Haunt You" — 4:00 / 3:55

Side two
"It's Time to Kiss" (duet with Patti LaBelle) — 5:30 / 5:50 *
 "This Planet's a Mess" — 4:07 / 4:12
 "Wave" — 4:30 / 4:31
 "Boonga (The New Jersey Caveman)" — 4:45 / 4:28

* Remixed by Michael Vail Blum for 1991 re-release.

Personnel
Credits are adapted from the Fred Schneider and the Shake Society liner notes.

Musicians

 Fred Schneider – vocals; piano; keyboards
 Kate Pierson – backing vocals (side 1, tracks 1, 3, 5; side 2, track 4)
 John Coté – guitars; memorymoog; Mega synthesizer bass; drum programming; background vocals
 Lamar Mitchell – vocoder
 Ronnie Ardito – drum programming
 Hellions – background vocals
 Leslie Ming – drums
 Bernie Worrell – synthesizer; clavinet; vocoder
 Tom Beckerman – guitar (side 1, tracks 1–3; side 2, tracks 2, 4)
 Trevor Gayle – kettle drums
 Steve Scales – cabassa
 Shailah Edmonds – background vocals
 Billy Amendola – drums
 Eluriel "Tinker" Barfield – drum fills
 Ronald Drayton – guitar
 Ronnie Ardito – guitar; keyboards; background vocals
 Chris Schneider – background vocals
 B.J. Nelson – background vocals
 Richard Beau – percussion
 Robert Molnar – drum programming; background vocals
 Lisa Lubitz – background vocals
 Patti LaBelle – vocals (side 2, track 1)
 Geoffrey Armes – percussion

Production and artwork
 Fred Schneider – producer; arranger; art direction; design
 Bernie Worrell – producer; additional arrangements
 John Coté – arranger
 Butch Jones – engineer; additional arrangements
 Rob Casoria – assistant engineer
 Mark Kamins – mixer (side 1, track 2; side 2, track 4)
 Phil Brown – mastering
 George DeBose – design; photography
 Robert Molnar – fashion
 Jane Pittman – makeup
 Gary Kurfirst – management

Charts
Singles

References

External links

Fred Schneider albums
1984 debut albums
Warner Records albums